Bundelia is a genus of moths in the family Geometridae.

Species
 Bundelia ochracea Viidalepp, 1988

References
 Bundelia at Markku Savela's Lepidoptera and Some Other Life Forms
Natural History Museum Lepidoptera genus database

Melanthiini
Geometridae genera